This is a list of valid species of the myrmicine genus Solenopsis (fire ants).  There are over 200 species in this genus.

Species
Solenopsis abdita Thompson, 1989
Solenopsis abjectior Pacheco & Mackay, 2013
Solenopsis africana Santschi, 1914
Solenopsis alecto Santschi, 1934
†Solenopsis alena Özdikmen, 2010
Solenopsis altinodis Forel, 1912
Solenopsis amblychila Wheeler, 1915
Solenopsis andina Santschi, 1923
Solenopsis atlantis Santschi, 1934
Solenopsis aurea Wheeler, 1906
Solenopsis azteca Forel, 1893
Solenopsis basalis Forel, 1895
Solenopsis belisarius Forel, 1907
Solenopsis bicolor Emery, 1906
†Solenopsis blanda (Förster, 1891)
Solenopsis brazoensis (Buckley, 1866)
Solenopsis brevicornis Emery, 1888
Solenopsis bruchiella Emery, 1922
Solenopsis bruesi Creighton, 1930
Solenopsis bucki Kempf, 1973
Solenopsis canariensis Forel, 1893
Solenopsis capensis Mayr, 1866
Solenopsis carolinensis Forel, 1901
Solenopsis castor Forel, 1893
Solenopsis celata (Dlussky & Zabelin, 1985)
Solenopsis clarki Crawley, 1922
Solenopsis clytemnestra Emery, 1896
Solenopsis conjurata Wheeler, 1925
Solenopsis cooperi Donisthorpe, 1947
Solenopsis corticalis Forel, 1881
Solenopsis crivellarii Menozzi, 1936
Solenopsis daguerrei (Santschi, 1930)
Solenopsis dalli (Kusnezov, 1969)
Solenopsis debilior Santschi, 1934
Solenopsis decipiens Emery, 1906
Solenopsis dentata Collingwood & Kugler, 1994
Solenopsis desecheoensis Mann, 1920
Solenopsis deserticola Ruzsky, 1905
Solenopsis dysderces Snelling, 1975
Solenopsis egregia (Kusnezov, 1953)
Solenopsis electra Forel, 1914
Solenopsis elhawagryi Sharaf & Aldawood, 2012
Solenopsis emeryi Santschi, 1934
Solenopsis emiliae Santschi, 1912
Solenopsis enigmatica Deyrup & Prusak, 2008
Solenopsis eximia (Kusnezov, 1953)
Solenopsis fairchildi Wheeler, 1926
†Solenopsis foersteri Théobald, 1937
Solenopsis franki Forel, 1908
Solenopsis froggatti Forel, 1913
Solenopsis fugax (Latreille, 1798)
Solenopsis fusciventris Clark, 1934
Solenopsis gallica Santschi, 1934
Solenopsis gayi (Spinola, 1851)
Solenopsis geminata (Fabricius, 1804)
Solenopsis gensterblumi Forel, 1901
Solenopsis georgica Menozzi, 1942
Solenopsis germaini Emery, 1895
Solenopsis globularia (Smith, 1858)
Solenopsis gnoma Pacheco, Herrera & MacKay, 2007
Solenopsis gnomula Emery, 1915
Solenopsis goeldii Forel, 1912
Solenopsis granivora Kusnezov, 1957
Solenopsis hayemi Forel, 1908
Solenopsis helena Emery, 1895
Solenopsis hostilis (Borgmeier, 1959)
Solenopsis iheringi Forel, 1908
Solenopsis ilinei Santschi, 1936
Solenopsis impolita Moreno-Gonzalez, Mackay & Pacheco, 2013
Solenopsis indagatrix Wheeler, 1928
Solenopsis insculpta Clark, 1938
Solenopsis insinuans Santschi, 1933
Solenopsis interrupta Santschi, 1916
Solenopsis invicta Buren, 1972
Solenopsis isopilis Pacheco & Mackay, 2013
Solenopsis jacoti Wheeler, 1923
Solenopsis jalalabadica Pisarski, 1970
Solenopsis japonica Wheeler, 1928
Solenopsis joergenseni Santschi, 1919
Solenopsis johnsoni Pacheco, Mackay & Moreno-Gonzalez, 2013
Solenopsis juliae (Arakelian, 1991)
Solenopsis kabylica Santschi, 1934
Solenopsis knuti Pisarski, 1967
Solenopsis kochi Finzi, 1936
Solenopsis krockowi Wheeler, 1908
Solenopsis laeviceps Mayr, 1870
Solenopsis latastei Emery, 1895
Solenopsis latro Forel, 1894
Solenopsis leptanilloides Santschi, 1925
Solenopsis longiceps Forel, 1907
Solenopsis longinoi Pacheco & Mackay, 2013
Solenopsis loretana Santschi, 1936
Solenopsis lotophaga Santschi, 1911
Solenopsis lou Forel, 1902
Solenopsis lucayensis Wheeler, 1908
Solenopsis lusitanica Emery, 1915
Solenopsis maboya Snelling, 2001
Solenopsis macdonaghi Santschi, 1916
Solenopsis macrops Santschi, 1917
Solenopsis madara Roger, 1863
Solenopsis major Forel, 1913
Solenopsis maligna Santschi, 1910
Solenopsis mameti Donisthorpe, 1946
Solenopsis marxi Forel, 1915
Solenopsis maxillosa Emery, 1900
†Solenopsis maxima (Förster, 1891)
Solenopsis megera Santschi, 1934
Solenopsis megergates Trager, 1991
Solenopsis melina Pacheco & Mackay, 2013
Solenopsis metanotalis Emery, 1896
Solenopsis metatarsalis (Kusnezov, 1957)
Solenopsis minutissima Emery, 1906
†Solenopsis moesta (Förster, 1891)
Solenopsis molesta (Say, 1836)
Solenopsis mozabensis (Bernard, 1977)
Solenopsis nickersoni Thompson, 1982
Solenopsis nigella Emery, 1888
Solenopsis nitens Bingham, 1903
Solenopsis nitida (Dlussky & Radchenko, 1994)
Solenopsis normandi Santschi, 1934
Solenopsis occipitalis Santschi, 1911
Solenopsis ocellata Moreno-Gonzalez, Mackay & Pacheco, 2013
Solenopsis oculata Santschi, 1925
Solenopsis omana Collingwood & Agosti, 1996
Solenopsis oraniensis Forel, 1894
Solenopsis orbula Emery, 1875
Solenopsis orbuloides André, 1890
Solenopsis orestes Forel, 1903
Solenopsis overbecki Viehmeyer, 1916
Solenopsis pachycera (Forel, 1915)
Solenopsis papuana Emery, 1900
Solenopsis parva Mayr, 1868
Solenopsis patagonica Emery, 1906
Solenopsis patriciae Pacheco & Mackay, 2013
Solenopsis pawaensis Mann, 1919
Solenopsis pergandei Forel, 1901
Solenopsis phoretica Davis & Deyrup, 2006
Solenopsis photophila Santschi, 1923
Solenopsis picea Emery, 1896
Solenopsis picquarti Forel, 1899
Solenopsis picta Emery, 1895
Solenopsis pilosula Wheeler, 1908
Solenopsis polita (Smith, 1862)
Solenopsis pollux Forel, 1893
†Solenopsis privata (Förster, 1891)
Solenopsis pulleni Pacheco, Mackay & Moreno-Gonzalez, 2013
Solenopsis punctaticeps Mayr, 1865
Solenopsis pusillignis Trager, 1991
Solenopsis pygmaea Forel, 1901
Solenopsis pythia Santschi, 1934
Solenopsis quadridentata Pacheco, Mackay & Moreno-Gonzalez, 2013
Solenopsis quinquecuspis Forel, 1913
Solenopsis richteri Forel, 1909
Solenopsis rugiceps Mayr, 1870
Solenopsis sabeana (Buckley, 1866)
Solenopsis saevissima (Smith, 1855)
Solenopsis salina Wheeler, 1908
Solenopsis santschii Forel, 1905
Solenopsis saudiensis Sharaf & Aldawood, 2011
Solenopsis schilleri Santschi, 1923
Solenopsis scipio Santschi, 1911
Solenopsis sea (Kusnezov, 1953)
Solenopsis seychellensis Forel, 1909
Solenopsis shiptoni Forel, 1914
Solenopsis solenopsidis (Kusnezov, 1953)
Solenopsis soochowensis Wheeler, 1921
Solenopsis striata Pacheco & Mackay, 2013
Solenopsis stricta Emery, 1896
Solenopsis substituta Santschi, 1925
Solenopsis subterranea MacKay & Vinson, 1989
Solenopsis subtilis Emery, 1896
Solenopsis succinea Emery, 1890
Solenopsis sulfurea (Roger, 1862)
Solenopsis sumara Collingwood & Agosti, 1996
†Solenopsis superba (Förster, 1891)
Solenopsis targuia Bernard, 1953
Solenopsis tennesseensis Smith, 1951
Solenopsis tenuis Mayr, 1878
Solenopsis terricola Menozzi, 1931
Solenopsis tertialis Ettershank, 1966
Solenopsis tetracantha Emery, 1906
Solenopsis texana Emery, 1895
Solenopsis thoracica Santschi, 1923
Solenopsis tipuna Forel, 1912
Solenopsis tonsa Thompson, 1989
Solenopsis torresi Snelling, 2001
Solenopsis tridens Forel, 1911
Solenopsis ugandensis Santschi, 1933
†Solenopsis valida (Förster, 1891)
Solenopsis vinsoni Pacheco & Mackay, 2013
Solenopsis virulens (Smith, 1858)
Solenopsis vorax Santschi, 1934
Solenopsis wasmannii Emery, 1894
Solenopsis westwoodi Forel, 1894
Solenopsis weyrauchi Trager, 1991
Solenopsis whitfordi Mackay, Moreno-Gonzalez & Pacheco, 2013
Solenopsis wolfi Emery, 1915
Solenopsis xyloni [no authors], 1879
Solenopsis zambesiae Arnold, 1926
Solenopsis zeteki Wheeler, 1942
Solenopsis zingibara Collingwood & Agosti, 1996

References

Solenopsis